The 2006 Italian Open (also known as 2006 Rome Masters and the 2006 Internazionali d'Italia) was a tennis tournament played on clay courts. It was the 63rd edition of the Italian Open and was part of the ATP Masters Series of the 2006 ATP Tour and of the Tier I Series of the 2006 WTA Tour. It took place at the Foro Italico in Rome, Italy from May 8 through May 22, 2006.

Review
The men's tournament was won by Rafael Nadal with a five-set victory against the Swiss top seed Roger Federer. The women's draw was won by Swiss player, Martina Hingis, who prevailed 6–2, 7–5, against Dinara Safina. 

Daniela Hantuchová and Ai Sugiyama were victorious in the women's doubles, beating Francesca Schiavone and Květa Peschke, while third seeds Mark Knowles and Daniel Nestor beat sixth seeds Jonathan Erlich and Andy Ram in the final of the men's doubles.

Finals

Men's singles

 Rafael Nadal defeated  Roger Federer 6–7(0–7), 7–6(7–5), 6–4, 2–6, 7–6(7–5)

Women's singles

 Martina Hingis defeated  Dinara Safina 6–2, 7–5

Men's doubles

 Mark Knowles /  Daniel Nestor defeated  Jonathan Erlich /  Andy Ram 6–4, 5–7, [13–11]

Women's doubles

 Daniela Hantuchová /  Ai Sugiyama defeated  Francesca Schiavone and  Květa Peschke 3–6, 6–3, 6–1

References
general
Men's Singles draw
Men's Doubles draw
Women's draws
specific 

Italian Open
Italian Open
 
2006 Italian Open (Tennis)
Tennis